Oriini Kaipara (born 1983) is a New Zealand Māori broadcaster, journalist and translator and interpreter of te reo Māori and English. Kaipara has worked for Mai FM, TVNZ 1, Māori Television, and Three. She currently co-hosts Three's weekly political current affairs show Newshub Nation. 

In 2019 Kaipara was the first person with a moko kauae tā moko facial tattoo to present mainstream television news. In 2021 she became the first such person to host a primetime news program on national television.

Early life 

Kaipara was born in Whakatāne in 1983. Her iwi are Tūhoe, Ngāti Awa, Tūwharetoa and Ngāti Rangitihi. She attended a Kura Kaupapa Māori, and trained at South Seas Film and Television School in 2002.

Career 
Kaipara was a newsreader at Mai FM, and then in 2004 joined TVNZ's fully te reo Māori Waka Huia as a reporter and director. 

In 2017, the Māori Television programme Native Affairs, which she presented, revealed she has essentially pure Māori DNA, despite having some Pākehā ancestry. 

She received her moko kauae facial tattoo in January 2019 while she was a journalist for TVNZ's Te Karere. In November 2019 she was the first person with a moko kauae to present mainstream television news on TVNZ's One News. 

In May 2021 she moved to Three and began presenting news on the programme Newshub Live at 4.30pm. 

In February 2022 Kaipara joined Simon Shepherd as co-host of Three's weekly political current affairs show Newshub Nation. As host, she is valued for her conversational fluency in both Māori and English, her approach to political issues that are important to Māori, and her commitment to the renewal of both te reo Māori and tikanga Māori.

Recognition 
In 2008, Kaipara won the best female television presenter award at the Māori Media Awards. In 2018, Kaipara won the Voyager award for Best Māori Affairs Reporter for her work on Native Affairs for Māori Television.

In 2021 Kaipara received international recognition for being the first person to host a primetime news program on national television, with traditional facial markings.

Personal life 
Kaipara lives in West Auckland and has four children.

In 2020 Kaipara was upset by a portrait painted of her without permission by Auckland artist Samantha Payne. After talking with Kaipara, the artist apologised and removed the portrait from public sale.

See also 
 List of New Zealand television personalities

References

1983 births
Living people
Ngāi Tūhoe people
Ngāti Awa people
Ngāti Tūwharetoa people
Ngāti Rangitihi people
People from Whakatāne
New Zealand television presenters
New Zealand women television presenters
New Zealand Māori broadcasters
New Zealand Māori women